This is a partial list of six-man football venues in Texas.

References

Texas Bob's High School Stadium Database

Lists of stadiums
 
 
American football-related lists
Texas sports-related lists